Trochilonyssus is a genus of mites in the family Rhinonyssidae. This genus has a single species, Trochilonyssus trinitatis.

References

Rhinonyssidae
Articles created by Qbugbot